Draško Đorđević (also transliterated Djordjević; born 1 August 1993) is a Serbian footballer who plays as a centre back for Rad.

Club career
Born in Belgrade, Đorđević started his career with Obilić, where he made his first football steps. Later he moved to Red Star Belgrade, passing the greatest part of his youth categories with the club. He made his first senior appearance playing with Palilulac Beograd at the age of 17. He stayed with the club until the end of 2012. Later he spent the whole 2013 with Radnički Beograd and moved to BASK at the beginning of 2014. Playing with BASK, Đorđević noted 21 Serbian League Belgrade appearance, scoring 1 goal between 2014 and 2015. At the beginning of 2015–16 season, Đorđević moved to Serbian First League side Donji Srem. He became starting player shortly after and collected 23 matches at total until the end of season, mostly playing as a centre-back or left-back. In summer 2016, Đorđević signed one-year contract with Bežanija.

At the beginning of 2017, Đorđević moved on trial to Red Star Belgrade. After he spent the winter break off-season with the first team, playing some friendly matches, Đorđević signed two-and-a-half year deal with the club, being loaned to the Serbian First League side OFK Beograd until the end of 2016–17 campaign. At the beginning of May 2017, Đorđević suffered a leg fracture after Miodrag Gemović's bad tackle during the game against Mačva Šabac. In summer 2017, Đorđević returned to Bežanija at one-year loan deal.

Career statistics

References

External links
 
 

1993 births
Living people
Footballers from Belgrade
Association football defenders
Serbian footballers
Serbian expatriate footballers
FK Palilulac Beograd players
FK Radnički Beograd players
FK BASK players
FK Donji Srem players
FK Bežanija players
Red Star Belgrade footballers
OFK Beograd players
Al-Mujazzal Club players
FK Spartak Subotica players
FK Sinđelić Beograd players
FK Rabotnički players
Saudi First Division League players
Serbian SuperLiga players
Serbian First League players
Macedonian First Football League players
Serbian expatriate sportspeople in Saudi Arabia
Serbian expatriate sportspeople in North Macedonia
Expatriate footballers in Saudi Arabia
Expatriate footballers in North Macedonia